The Olympic qualification period was between 2 May 2011 and 29 April 2012, and the Badminton World Federation rankings list, published on 3 May 2012, was used to allocate spots. Nations can enter a total of three players. Three quota places if three players are ranked four or above, two if two players are ranked 16 or above and otherwise one quota place until the quota contingent of 38 is filled.

For each male player who qualifies in more than one discipline, an additional quota place in the Men's Singles becomes free. If no player from one continent can qualify, the best ranked player from this continent gets a quota place.

Qualifying criteria

The main qualifying criterion was the BWF Ranking list as of May 3, 2012. It provided a total of 16 pairs in each doubles event and 38 athletes in each singles event, in the following manner:
Rankings 1–4: Players/pairs were taken in turn unless a NOC had already qualified 3 players/pairs.
Rankings 5–16: Players/pairs were taken in turn unless a NOC had already qualified 2 players/pairs.
Rankings 17+: Players/pairs were taken in turn unless a NOC had already qualified 1 player/pair.

Each continent was guaranteed one entry in each event. If this was not satisfied by the entry selection method described above, the highest ranking player/pair was qualified. If there was no player/pair in the rankings, the winner of the most recently contested Continental Championship was qualified. A country could only advantage from this rule twice.

The host nation (Great Britain) was entitled to enter 2 players in total, but more than 2 players were permitted if they all qualified under qualifying regulations.

There were also 2 invitational places in each singles event which were allocated by the IOC Tripartite Commission, however the BWF decided to allocate wildcards to men only.

Qualification summary

Qualifiers
The color pink signifies that a player was withdrawn from the competition.

Men's singles

Women's singles

Men's doubles

Women's doubles

Mixed doubles

References

Qualification for the 2012 Summer Olympics
Qualification